Psalm Clerk is the twenty-fourth studio album by King Creosote, released in 2003.

Track listing
One Angel No Wings    
You Cuckoos      
Plans Best Laid       
Guess The Time     
Clerkworks       
Not One Bit Ashamed      
Snakes From Single Socks      
Figure 8      
Who Did You Kill On The Way Up?      
More Often Than Nought    
Angela♥KC      
Such Fine Deeds       
Marianne♥KC      
My Problem Is ...      
Your Own Spell     
Happy With Our Lot     
Scoring You Twice       
Love Your Present       
Mercy Killing      
No Contestvkwaing     
Spy Attack      
Musakal Lives    
Buzz Off

2003 albums
King Creosote albums